Skřipov is a municipality and village in Opava District in the Moravian-Silesian Region of the Czech Republic. It has about 1,000 inhabitants.

Administrative parts
The village of Hrabství is an administrative part of Skřipov.

History
The first written mention of Skřipov is from 1271.

The first written mention of Hrabství is from 1460. Until 1916 it was administratively a part of Výškovice (which is today a part of Bílovec). In 1916 it became a separate municipality. In 1979 Skřipov and Hrabství were merged into one municipality.

References

External links

Villages in Opava District